Juan Merlo de la Fuente (died in 1665) was a Mexican clergyman and bishop for the Roman Catholic Diocese of Comayagua. He was in Nopalucan. He became ordained in 1651. He was appointed bishop in 1650. He died in 1665.

References

Year of birth missing
Mexican Roman Catholic priests
1665 deaths
People from Comayagua
17th-century Roman Catholic bishops in Honduras
Roman Catholic bishops of Comayagua